Colin Mackenzie Low, Baron Low of Dalston,  (born 23 September 1942) is a British politician, law scholar and member of the House of Lords.

Early life
Low was born in Edinburgh and has been blind since the age of three.  He was educated at what is now New College Worcester, at The Queen's College, Oxford (BA) and at Cambridge University (Diploma in Criminology).

Career
Low was a Lecturer in the Faculty of Law at the University of Leeds from 1968 until 1984 and later held a research post at City University London until 2000.

He is a Vice-President of the RNIB and former Chairman. He was also President of the European Blind Union (EBU) for 8 years from 2003. He is a board member of the Snowdon Trust, founded by the Antony Armstrong-Jones, 1st Earl of Snowdon, which provides grants and scholarships for students with disabilities.

Low is the Immediate Past President of the International Council for Education of People with Visual Impairment.

Honours
Low was appointed a Commander of the Order of the British Empire (CBE) in the 2000 New Year Honours for services to the RNIB and disabled peoples' rights.  On 13 June 2006, he was created a life peer as Baron Low of Dalston, of Dalston in the London Borough of Hackney and he sits as a crossbencher.

In 2014 he was awarded the Liberty Human Rights 'Campaign of the Year Award'.  The citation reads: "for leading the campaign to ensure the protection of the Human Rights Act would apply to all residential care provided or arranged by local authorities. His victory forced the Government to accept the importance of guaranteeing human rights protections by demonstrating just how relevant those rights are for all."
The award was presented to Lord Low at the annual Human Rights Awards ceremony at Queen Elizabeth Hall, London, on 1 December 2014.

References

 House of Lords minutes
Lord Low's maiden speech

1942 births
Living people
Blind royalty and nobility
Commanders of the Order of the British Empire
People's peers 
Blind politicians
Academics of the University of Leeds
Crossbench life peers
People from Dalston
People from the London Borough of Hackney
Life peers created by Elizabeth II